Ahmadabad (also Romanized as Aḩmadābād; also known as Aḩmad Badal, Aḩmad Balab, Aḩmad Balad, and Bābā Aḩmad) is a village in Qaleh-ye Khvajeh Rural District, in the Central District of Andika County, Khuzestan Province, Iran. At the 2006 census, its population was 179, in 32 families.

References 

Populated places in Andika County